Ana Kojić (born 4 October 1997) is a Serbian handball player for Siófok KC and the Serbian national team.

She represented Serbia at the 2019 World Championship and 2021 World Championship.

References

External links

Serbian female handball players
1997 births
Living people
People from Ub, Serbia
Expatriate handball players
Serbian expatriate sportspeople in Slovenia